Channel 33 may refer to several television stations:

Canal 33 (El Salvador), a television station in San Salvador, El Salvador
Channel 33 (Israel), an Israeli public television channel mainly for Arabic-speaking viewers
Dubai One, an English language television channel in the MENA region, formerly known as Channel 33 or Ch33
DZOZ-TV (Light TV 33), a television station in Metro Manila, Philippines

Canada
The following television stations operate on virtual channel 33 in Canada:
 CFTF-DT-8 in Les Escoumins, Quebec
 CICO-DT-59 in Chatham, Ontario

Mexico
The following television station operates on virtual channel 33 in Mexico:
 XHAS-TDT in Tijuana, Baja California

See also
 Channel 33 virtual TV stations in the United States
For UHF frequencies covering 584-590 MHz
 Channel 33 TV stations in Canada
 Channel 33 TV stations in Mexico
 Channel 33 digital TV stations in the United States
 Channel 33 low-power TV stations in the United States

33